This is a list of members of the South Australian Legislative Council from 1910 to 1912

It was the third Legislative Council to be fully determined by provisions of the (State) Constitution Act 779 of 1901, which provided for, inter alia, a reduction in the number of seats from 24 to 18, realignment of District borders to encompass Assembly electorates, six-year terms (one half of the Council retiring every three years), and elections held jointly with the House of Assembly.

The election of 1910 was called after a Constitutional crisis when Thomas Price died, and John Verran refused to negotiate a coalition government like the Price-Peake administration.

 The three anti-Labor parties, the Liberal and Democratic Union, the Australasian National League and the Farmers and Producers Political Union, formally merged to form the Liberal Union in late 1910. They had been in merger discussions for some time, and had jointly endorsed a united Liberal ticket for the Legislative Council at the 1910 election.
 Liberal MLC Theodore Bruce died on 1 July 1911. Liberal candidate Charles Morris won the resulting by-election on 5 August.

References
Parliament of South Australia — Statistical Record of the Legislature

Members of South Australian parliaments by term
20th-century Australian politicians